Slovakia competed at the 2014 Winter Paralympics in Sochi, Russia, held between 7–16 March 2014.

Medalists

Alpine skiing

Men

Women

Snowboarding

Para-snowboarding is making its debut at the Winter Paralympics and it will be placed under the Alpine skiing program during the 2014 Games.

Men

Biathlon 

Men

Cross-country skiing

Men

Wheelchair curling

Team

Standings

Results

Draw 1
Saturday, 8 March 9:30

Draw 3
Saturday, 9 March, 9:30

Draw 4
Sunday, 9 March, 15:30

Draw 6
Monday, 10 March, 15:30

Draw 7
Monday, 11 March, 9:30

Draw 8
Tuesday, 11 March, 15:30

Draw 9
Wednesday, 12 March, 9:30

Draw 11
Thursday, 13 March, 9:30

Draw 12
Thursday, 13 March, 15:30

See also
Slovakia at the Paralympics
Slovakia at the 2014 Winter Olympics

References

Nations at the 2014 Winter Paralympics
2014
Winter Paralympics